= Red Armenian Army (militant organization) =

Militant organization

The Red Armenian Army (RAA), also known as the Armenian Red Army, was a small militant organization, which organized a single unsuccessful attack against the Turkish Consul General, Kemalettin Demirer, on 1 July 1982 in Rotterdam, Netherlands. The group used a gun in the assassination attempt.

The Armenian Red Army has not claimed any attacks in over two decades and is presumed to be disbanded and inactive.
